Christian Hohenadel (born 20 September 1976 in Dudweiler) is a German racing driver.

Together with Daniel Keilwitz, he won four races and the drivers championship of the 2010 FIA GT3 championship, driving a Callaway Corvette Z06.R GT3
 
In the 2011 FIA GT1 World Championship season, Hohenadel and Andrea Piccini compete for Hexis AMR in an Aston Martin DBR9 an. They won the fourth event, at the German Sachsenring.

On the Nürburgring, he was part of the Audi TT RS team that set the first VLN pole with a FWD car on 27 August 2011.

Career

Complete GT1 World Championship results

References

External links 
 driverdb.com: Christian Hohenadel

1976 births
Living people
German racing drivers
A1 Team Germany drivers
German Formula Renault 2.0 drivers
Formula Renault Eurocup drivers
Italian Formula Renault 2.0 drivers
International Formula Master drivers
Karting World Championship drivers
World Series Formula V8 3.5 drivers
FIA GT1 World Championship drivers
ADAC GT Masters drivers
Sportspeople from Saarbrücken
Racing drivers from Saarland
24H Series drivers
Rowe Racing drivers
Nürburgring 24 Hours drivers
Michelin Pilot Challenge drivers